CJHR-FM is a Canadian radio station broadcasting at 98.7 FM, in Renfrew, Ontario with a community radio format.

History
On September 8, 2004, V.R. Garbutt, on behalf of a not for profit corporation to be incorporated (Valley Heritage Radio) received an approved licensed from the Canadian Radio-television and Telecommunications Commission (CRTC) to operate an English-language FM Type B community radio station in Renfrew. The proposed station would operate at 98.7 MHz with an effective radiated power of 14,000 watts (maximum of 27,000 watts). Antenna height would be 106.3 metres. On October 27, 2006, CJHR was authorized to decrease effective radiated power from 14,000 watts (27,000 maximum) to 13,000 watts (20,000 maximum), and decrease antenna height from 106.3 metres to 105.3 metres. There would also be a change in the proposed antenna site.

CJHR began on-air testing at 98.7 MHz on December 11, 2006 and officially signed on on January 15, 2007. The first song ever played on CJHR-FM was Vic Garbutt's Waltz, by Calvin Vollrath.

Notes
The 98.7 frequency was once occupied by CBOF-FM-8 in Renfrew, but was deleted in the early 1990s after the former CBOF on the AM band moved to 90.7 FM in Ottawa.

References

External links
 Valley Heritage Radio CJHR 98.7 FM
 
 

Jhr
Jhr
Radio stations established in 2006
2006 establishments in Ontario